In abstract algebra, a torsion abelian group is an abelian group in which every element has finite order. For example, the torsion subgroup of an abelian group is a torsion abelian group.

See also 

 Betti number

References 

Abelian group theory